Alfred Willis Marshall (9 January 1888–1923) was an English footballer who played in the Football League for Fulham and Oldham Athletic.

References

1888 births
1923 deaths
English footballers
Association football midfielders
English Football League players
Fulham F.C. players
Oldham Athletic A.F.C. players